The Deaf-Mute Filippo Viotti's Vision of the Virgin Mary is an oil on canvas painting by Moretto da Brescia, executed c. 1534, displayed in the Santuario della Madonna at Paitone in the Province of Brescia, Italy. It is first recorded in 1648 by Carlo Ridolfi, who wrote that "in the church atop Monte Paitone one can still admire a miraculous image of the Virgin which Moretto made at the request of that town for such a miracle".

It shows Viotti's vision of the Virgin Mary in August 1532 and his resulting miraculous cure. It belongs to the artist's mature period but is separate from his style of that time due to its attempt to be as faithful a reproduction of the miracle as possible. It is marked by the Virgin's flowing robes, the very precise artistic rendering and the extremely concrete nature of the figures, where the sacred is totally translated into the real and no obviously miraculous elements are shown.

Note

Bibliography (in Italian)
Michele Biancale, Giovanni Battista Moroni e i pittori bresciani in "L'arte", anno 17, Roma 1914
Joseph Archer Crowe, Giovanni Battista Cavalcaselle, A history of painting in North Italy, Londra 1871
Gustavo Frizzoni, Recensione dei pittori italiani - Le Gallerie di Monaco e Dresda in "Archivio storico dell'arte", anno 6, 1893
Valerio Guazzoni, Moretto. Il tema sacro, Brescia 1981
Giovanni Morelli, Le opere dei maestri italiani nelle Gallerie di Monaco, Dresda e Berlino, Bologna 1886
Fausto Lechi, Gaetano Panazza, La pittura bresciana del Rinascimento, catalogo della mostra, Bergamo 1939
Pier Virgilio Begni Redona, Alessandro Bonvicino - Il Moretto da Brescia, Editrice La Scuola, Brescia 1988
Carlo Ridolfi, Le maraviglie dell'arte Ouero le vite de gl'illvstri pittori veneti, e dello stato. Oue sono raccolte le Opere insigni, i costumi, & i ritratti loro. Con la narratione delle Historie, delle Fauole, e delle Moralità da quelli dipinte, Brescia 1648

Paintings by Moretto da Brescia
Paintings of the Virgin Mary
1534 paintings
Paintings in the Province of Brescia